Elton Wilfrid 'Duffy' Plummer (31 July 1914 – 30 May 1988) was an Australian rules footballer who played with Essendon in the VFL during the 1930s and 1940s.

Plummer was the younger brother of Essendon player Harry Plummer.

Essendon recruited Plummer, a back pocket specialist, from Preston. At one stage he played 98 consecutive games and was a member of Essendon's 1942 premiership team. He also played in their losing Grand Finals of 1941 and 1943. Plummer kicked just one goal in his career, against Collingwood at Victoria Park. In 1944, his final season, he coached Essendon for seven games with regular coach Dick Reynolds suffering from appendicitis and they won three of them. He continued his coaching career at Brunswick in 1945.

References

Holmesby, Russell and Main, Jim (2007). The Encyclopedia of AFL Footballers. 7th ed. Melbourne: Bas Publishing.
Ancestry

1914 births
Australian rules footballers from Victoria (Australia)
Essendon Football Club players
Essendon Football Club Premiership players
Essendon Football Club coaches
Preston Football Club (VFA) players
Brunswick Football Club players
Brunswick Football Club coaches
1988 deaths
One-time VFL/AFL Premiership players